"18 and Life" is a song by American heavy metal band Skid Row. It was released in June 1989 as the second single from their self-titled debut album. The power ballad is the band's biggest hit, reaching  4 on the US Billboard Hot 100 and No. 11 on the Billboard Album Rock Tracks chart. It was certified gold by the Recording Industry Association of America (RIAA) on September 13, 1989, when it sold 500,000 copies. The song also charted at No. 12 on the UK Singles Chart, No. 6 in Canada, and  No. 5 in Ireland.

In April 2015, Skid Row released a new version of the song with then-lead vocalist Tony Harnell.

Theme
The title of the song alludes to its subject, 18-year-old Ricky, receiving a sentence of life imprisonment for the murder of another teen. The song paints Ricky's youth as his undoing. It was believed for a long time that guitarist Dave Sabo got the idea from a newspaper article about an 18-year-old named Ricky who was sentenced to life imprisonment for killing his friend with a gun, that due to alcohol, he most likely guessed was not loaded. However, in an interview with the Professor of Rock, Sabo states that the original inspiration was his brother Rick's life after coming home from Vietnam. The writing process eventually led the song to being about an accidental murder. The music video also alludes to this.

Charts

Weekly charts

Year-end charts

Certifications

Release history

References

External links
 Skid Row - official website

1980s ballads
1989 songs
1989 singles
Atlantic Records singles
Glam metal ballads
Murder ballads
Music videos directed by Wayne Isham
Rock ballads
Skid Row (American band) songs
Songs about crime
Songs about prison
Songs based on actual events
Songs written by Dave Sabo
Songs written by Rachel Bolan
Teenage tragedy songs